The 1955 World Greco-Roman Wrestling Championships were held in Karlsruhe, West Germany.

Medal table

Team ranking

Medal summary

Men's Greco-Roman

References
FILA Database

World Wrestling Championships
W
International wrestling competitions hosted by Germany
1955 in German sport
1955 in sport wrestling